János Héder (20 October 1933 – 6 September 2014) was a Hungarian gymnast. He competed in seven events at the 1956 Summer Olympics.

References

1933 births
2014 deaths
Hungarian male artistic gymnasts
Olympic gymnasts of Hungary
Gymnasts at the 1956 Summer Olympics
Gymnasts from Budapest